Cryptolechia hemiarthra is a moth in the family Depressariidae. It was described by Edward Meyrick in 1922. It is found in southern India.

The wingspan is about 19 mm. The forewings are pale brownish-ochreous, with scattered dark fuscous specks. The stigmata are blackish, the plical somewhat beyond the first discal, the second discal transverse-linear, connected with the dorsum before the tornus by a dark fuscous streak followed by some irroration. The terminal area is somewhat darker, with a lighter inwards-oblique spot on the costa towards the apex.

References

Moths described in 1922
Cryptolechia (moth)
Taxa named by Edward Meyrick